Nicolaes Lastman (1585 in Amsterdam – 1625 in Amsterdam), was a Dutch Golden Age painter.  According to the Netherlands Institute for Art History, he was the brother of Pieter Lastman and is sometimes mistakenly called "Claes Pietersz Lastman" as the son of Pieter. He is known for portraits, landscapes, and architectural studies. He started a large schutterstuk in Amsterdam that was later finished by Adriaen van Nieulandt.

Works
Lastman's works include:
 The Agony in the garden
 Paesaggio con la predica di san giovanni battista 
 Civic guard of Abraham Boom and lieutenant Oetgens van Waveren

References

Nicolaes Lastman on Artnet

External links
 

1585 births
1625 deaths
Dutch Golden Age painters
Dutch male painters
Painters from Amsterdam